Lądek may refer to the following places:
Lądek, Konin County in Greater Poland Voivodeship (west-central Poland)
Lądek, Słupca County in Greater Poland Voivodeship (west-central Poland)
Lądek, Warmian-Masurian Voivodeship (north Poland)